The smooth-scaled death adder (Acanthophis laevis) is a species of venomous snake in the family Elapidae. The species is endemic to Southeast Asia and Oceania.

Distribution and habitat
A. laevis is found in Indonesia and Papua New Guinea.

Reproduction
A. laevis is viviparous.

References

Further reading
Macleay W (1878). "The Ophidians of the Chevert Expedition". The Proceedings of the Linnean Society of New South Wales 2: 33–41. (Acanthophis laevis, new species, pp. 40–41).
Wüster W, Dumbrell AJ, Hay C, Pook CE, Williams DJ, Fry BG (2005). "Snakes across the Strait: trans-Torresian phylogeographic relationships in three genera of Australasian snakes (Serpentes: Elapidae: Acanthophis, Oxyuranus, and Pseudechis)". Molecular Phylogenetics and Evolution 34 (1): 1–14.

Acanthophis
Snakes of New Guinea
Reptiles of Indonesia
Reptiles of Papua New Guinea
Reptiles described in 1878